Ernest Petrič (1936) is Slovenian judge, jurist, professor, and diplomat. He began his career at the Institute for National Issues (1961–1964). From 1967 to 1972, he served on the Executive Council of the Slovene government. He was with the University of Ljubljana from 1976 to 1988 in capacity of professor, vice dean and finally dean. From 1983 to 1986, he was with the Addis Ababa University as a professor of International Law. From 1989, he began serving as an ambassador, including the United States, India, and Austria, and, as a non-resident, Nepal, Mexico, and Brazil. He is an ambassador to the UN, IAEA, UNIDO, CTBTO, ODC, and OECD. As UN ambassador, he has served as elected president of the International Law Commission. For three years beginning in 1997 he served the Ministry of Foreign Affairs as its state secretary. From 2010 to 2013, he was president of the Slovenian Constitutional Court. Since 2017 he has served as a senior advisor to the president of Slovenia.

Bibliography

Books

 eBook

Further reading

References

External links 
International Law Commission
Hague Academy of International Law website
Google scholar

1936 births
21st-century Slovenian judges
Slovenian diplomats
Ambassadors of Slovenia to the United States
University of Ljubljana alumni
Living people
Ambassadors of Slovenia to Austria
Ambassadors of Slovenia to India
Ambassadors of Slovenia to Mexico
Ambassadors of Slovenia to Brazil
Ambassadors of Slovenia to Nepal
Academic staff of Addis Ababa University
Permanent Representatives of Slovenia to the United Nations
Academic staff of the University of Ljubljana
Members of the International Law Commission